Dillman is an unincorporated community in Dunklin County, in the U.S. state of Missouri.

The community was named after Frank Dillman, a businessperson in the lumber industry.

References

Unincorporated communities in Dunklin County, Missouri
Unincorporated communities in Missouri